Joseph-Adélard Godbout (September 24, 1892 – September 18, 1956) was a Canadian agronomist and politician.  He served as the 15th premier of Quebec briefly in 1936, and again from 1939 to 1944.  He served as leader of the Parti Libéral du Québec (PLQ).

Youth and early career

Adélard Godbout was born in Saint-Éloi.  He was the son of Eugène Godbout, agriculturalist and Liberal Member of the Legislative Assembly (MLA) from 1921 to 1923, and Marie-Louise Duret.  He studied at the Séminaire de Rimouski, the agricultural school of Sainte-Anne-de-la-Pocatière and the Massachusetts Agricultural College, in the U.S. state of Massachusetts. He then became teacher at the Sainte-Anne-de-la-Pocatière agricultural school from 1918 to 1930. He was an agronomist for the Ministry of Agriculture from 1922 to 1925.

Political career

Member of the legislature

Godbout became a Member of the legislature for the district of L'Islet in the Chaudière-Appalaches area, after he won a by-election without opposition on May 13, 1929.  He was re-elected in the 1931 and 1935 elections.

Cabinet Minister

Godbout was appointed to the Cabinet by Premier Alexandre Taschereau and served as Minister of Agriculture from November 27, 1930, to June 27, 1936.

First Premiership

Shortly after the 1935 election, Conservative Leader Maurice Duplessis, a rising star in Québec politics, forced Taschereau to call the Standing Committee on Public Accounts, which brought to light the existence of widespread corruption in the provincial government.  The revelations made by the committee were embarrassing for several Liberal insiders. On June 11, 1936, less than a year after being put back in office, Taschereau resigned. He recommended to Lieutenant Governor Ésioff-Léon Patenaude the names of Édouard Lacroix and Adélard Godbout for his successor as Premier.  Following constitutional conventions, the lieutenant governor offered the opportunity to form a government to Lacroix, who declined.  He then made the offer to Godbout, who accepted.  With the blessing of federal Cabinet Members, he took over Taschereau's job as Liberal Leader and Premier of Québec.  Godbout formed his first government and an election was called for August 1936.

Godbout had remained untouched by the scandals.  But despite Godbout's talks of "a new order" in an effort to distance himself from the Taschereau era, his first government lasted only two months, as his party suffered a humiliating defeat in the 1936 election.  Led by Duplessis, the recently created Union nationale was put in office.  The Liberals were reduced to 14 seats.  Godbout lost re-election in his own district of L'Islet.  He remained Liberal Leader after being reconfirmed at the 1938 party leadership convention, but T.-D. Bouchard led the parliamentary wing of the party until the 1939 election.

Second Premiership

World War II created the opportunity that Godbout needed to make a political comeback.  An early provincial general election was called in 1939 and federal Cabinet member Ernest Lapointe, the Quebec lieutenant of Prime Minister Mackenzie King, took the stump for Godbout.  He guaranteed that no one would face conscription if voters supported the Liberals.  Lapointe would die of cancer in 1941.

Through the campaign, Godbout relentlessly repeated the formal promise : "The government will never declare military conscription.  I undertake, on my honour, weighing each of my words, to leave my party and even to fight against it, if even one French Canadian, before the end of the hostilities in Europe, is mobilized against his will under a Liberal government." Their promise would soon haunt Liberal politicians.

In the meantime though, Godbout made a spectacular comeback.  He and 69 of his candidates were sent to the legislature. Godbout formed his second government, where he would serve as Premier and as minister of Agriculture.

Under Godbout's premiership, the provincial government implemented a number of significant progressive legislations, laying the groundwork for the Quiet Revolution that would be implemented by the government of Premier Jean Lesage a couple of decades later.  In fact, the Liberal administration delivered many of the proposals made by Paul Gouin's Action libérale nationale in 1935.

While Premier of Québec, Godbout published an article entitled "Canada: Unity in Diversity" (1943) in the Council on Foreign Relations journal. He asked, "How does the dual relationship of the French Canadians make them an element of strength and order, and therefore of unity, in our joint civilization, which necessarily includes not only Canada and the British Commonwealth of Nations, but also the United States, the Latin republics of America and liberated France?"

Accomplishments
These measures include:

the enactment of the right to vote for women in 1940, despite resistance from Duplessis and the Catholic Church;
the establishment of a Civil Service Commission in 1943;
the passage of an act that enforced compulsory school attendance until the age of 14 and the introduction of free education in primary schools in 1943;
the adoption of a Labour Code that established principles governing union certification and the negotiation of collective agreements in 1944;
the nationalization of the Montreal Light, Heat & Power Company, a private corporation who had a monopoly on gas and electric light in the Montreal area, which led to the creation of Hydro-Québec in 1944.
encouragement of French culture and language

Relations with the Dominion government

Because he served during wartime and dealt with Dominion (federal) politicians who believed in a strong Dominion government, Godbout was forced to abandon a number of traditional provincial jurisdictions.  The most notable prerogatives that he surrendered to the Government of Canada include:
the opportunity to create and oversight a provincial unemployment insurance system (a nationwide program was put into action in 1940);
the power to tax the income of individuals and corporations, in exchange for a much more modest financial compensation from the federal government. (Almost simultaneously, the federal government of Australia usurped state governments' tax powers.)

In a 1942 plebiscite, Canadian voters were asked to release the federal government from its commitment made to the Québec voters not to declare military conscription.  While the majority of predominantly French-speaking Québec refused to support such a release, English-speakers throughout Canada mostly did support it.  Even though not that many people were forced to serve until the end of the war, the decision made by Mackenzie King to allow conscription (when both he and Godbout had specifically ruled out conscription earlier) was very unpopular in Québec.  Duplessis, whose criticism of the federal encroachments upon the constitutional autonomy of the provinces capitalized on the Québec population's general mistrust of the federal government, had a field day.

Opposition Leader

In the 1944 provincial election, Godbout's Liberals and Duplessis' Union Nationale received similar shares of the popular vote, the Liberals getting slightly more votes but the UN enjoying a level of support in the province's rural areas that was strong enough to win a majority of seats to the legislature and thus form the government. During the 1944 election, Duplessis claimed in a very anti-Semitic speech that Godbout had together with the Dominion government agreed to take in 100,000 Jewish refugees and settle them in Quebec after the war in exchange for which the "International Zionist Brotherhood" was funding his reelection campaign. Duplessis claimed that he would never take money from the Jews, and if were elected Premier again, he would stop this alleged plan to settle 100,000 Jewish refugees in Quebec. Through this story was entirely false, it was widely believed, sparking such a surge of antisemitism to allow the Union Nationale to win.

Godbout served as Leader of the Opposition until the 1948 election.  Benefiting from post-war prosperity, the Union Nationale won an overwhelming majority.  The Liberals won only eight seats, six of whom were located on the Montreal Island.  Once again, Godbout narrowly lost re-election in his home district of L'Islet.  In 1950, he relinquished the leadership of the Liberal Party.

Senator

In 1949, Godbout was appointed to the Senate of Canada on the recommendation of Canadian Prime Minister Louis St. Laurent. He remained a senator until his death in 1956. His wife died in 1969 aged 79.

Legacy

Observers are divided about the significance of Godbout's legacy.  Lacking the oratory skills of Duplessis, his main political competitor, Godbout is sometimes judged very severely.

Federalists stress the importance progressive precedents that were set under Godbout's premiership.

Autonomists on the other hand criticize him for taking a weak stance in the matters of the province's autonomy.

More nuanced analysis claim that, being in power during World War II, he served in a difficult time, despite the shortcomings of his relations with the federal government.

In his 2000 film entitled Traître ou Patriote, filmmaker Jacques Godbout, Adélard's nephew, lamented what he perceived as a lack of public knowledge about his uncle's work and premiership.

On September 27, 2007, in a ceremony attended by Premier Jean Charest, a former electrical power station in Montréal, at the corner of Wellington and Queen streets, known as Poste Central-1 was named in honour of Godbout. A bust of Godbout by sculptor Joseph-Émile Brunet (1893–1977) has been installed at the site.

For his contribution to the field of agriculture and the advancement or rural Quebec in general, Mr. Godbout was posthumously inducted to Canadian Agricultural Hall of Fame in 1962 and to the Agricultural Hall of Fame of Quebec in 1992.

Elections as party leader

He lost the 1936 election, won the 1939 election, lost the 1944 election and lost the 1948 election.

Bibliography
Genest, Jean-Guy, Godbout, Septentrion, Sillery, 1996, 390 pp.

See also
Politics of Quebec
Quebec general elections
Timeline of Quebec history

Footnotes

References
Biography of Adélard Godbout from Marianopolis College

External links
 

1892 births
1956 deaths
Quebec Liberal Party MNAs
Premiers of Quebec
Canadian senators from Quebec
Liberal Party of Canada senators
People from Bas-Saint-Laurent
Quebec political party leaders
Canadian agronomists
Canadian people of World War II
Massachusetts Agricultural College alumni
20th-century agronomists